in Fukuoka, Japan was established as Fukuoka Medical College in 1903, which was affiliated with Kyoto Imperial University. In 1911, Kyushu Imperial University was founded. In 1947, after World War II ended, the university changed its name to Kyushu University. The university is composed of six campuses: Chikushi, Hospital, Ito, Ohashi, Hakozaki, and Beppu. There are numerous historic buildings dating back to the many phases of history the university has seen. The Third Residential Complex on-campus has a western-style design and is reserved for foreign students. The complex dates back to 1924 and has been designated as a Municipal Cultural Property.

Maidashi Campus
The Maidashi campus is the oldest campus and has many historic structures. It is located in Maidashi, which was once a quarter in the outskirts of Fukuoka-City, but nowadays is part of the Eastern district.

University Hospital

Medical Center (New Hospital)
The new University Hospital was constructed in three stages.  It has twelve floors; eleven are above ground and one is underground, with a total floor space of approximately 118,000 m2. Construction started in April 1998 and was finished by March 2008. It is the largest hospital under the jurisdiction of the Ministry of Education, Culture, Sports, Science, and Technology, and the first one to have a seismic isolation system.
 Outpatient Ward. 
The Outpatient Ward has six floors; five are above ground and one underground, and houses 28 departments.
 Westwing Building
This building was constructed in March 2008. It houses the Yusho Dioxine Research and Care Center and the Training Center for Minimally Invasive Surgery.
Tumor Center:
This center was completed in 1985.
Betatron Ward
This Ward was constructed in 1967 and closed in 2000.

Architecture dating from the Imperial University era

The first, second, and third medical schools and ward of Kyushu Imperial University Medical school, Basic Medical Research Building A
 These buildings where designed by Engo Iwasaki and Ken Kurata and construction completed in April 1931. Since there renovation, the ground floor houses are used as a Co-op store.　
School of Forensic Medicine, Bacteriology, and Hygiene (Faculty of Medicine, Basic Medical Research Building B)
This three-story building was constructed in 1935 by the Kaneko Group.
Dental Surgery and Orthopedic Surgery Building. (Dental School Clinical Research Building)
This building, designed by Shūzō Kunitake, was completed in 1934.
Fukuoka Medical School: gatehouse at the main gate
This tile-roofed wooden house is the oldest remaining structure in Kyushu University. It was designed by the local office of the Education Ministry's architecture department and built in 1903.
First Surgery Department and Ward
This three-story concrete building was designed by Ken Kurata and completed in May 1927. After eight decades it was dismantled.

Research establishments

Collective Research I
Its total floor space is 5,194 m2 is built of steel-reinforced concrete and has nine floors. It was established in March 2000, and construction was overseen by Sumitomo Mitsui Construction, design management was done by So Kikaku Sekkei Ltd.
Collective Research II
Its construction was overseen by the Mizoe Kensetsu Corporation. It is a steel-reinforced concrete seven-story building with a total area of 10562.96 m2.
Biomedical Research Stationei
The construction of this nine-story building was completed in October 2004. Its construction was overseen by a joint-venture group in cooperation with Obayashi Corporation, Wakachiku Construction Corporation and Zenkōmuten Corporation.

Educational establishments

Faculty of Medicine: Building A
It was constructed in 1975 and has a ground-floor area of 5,828 m2.
Medicine Bldg. B of Clinical Science
It was constructed in 1976 and has a ground-floor area of 6,874 m2.
Clinical machine wing / autopsy suite
It was constructed in 1976.
Dept. of Health Sciences, Faculty of Medicine (former Kyushu University Medical Junior College)
It was constructed in 1981 and has a ground-floor area of 406.5 m2.
Faculty of Pharmaceutical Science
It was constructed in 1967 and has a ground-floor area of 7,977 m2

Library, Museum, Sports facilities, Centennial Hall, Alumni House, Parking facilities
Medical Library
It was constructed in 1956.
Medical school: Centennial Hall (Hyakunen Kōdō)
 This facility is used for congresses, conferences and all kinds of academic meetings. There is also a cafeteria. Its construction was completed in 2008.
 Kubo-Memorial-Building (Kubo Kinenkan)
This two-story concrete building is the first Museum for the History of Medicine in Japan. The Kubo-Memorial-Building  was donated to Inokichi Kubo, the first professor and founder of the Department of Otorhinolaryngology, by the members of the Shisan-kai, an alumni association of the Kubo school, on 8 May 1927 at the occasion of the 20th anniversary of the foundation of the school, and later donated to Kyushu Imperial University. In 1999 and 2003 the building was renovated.
Gymnasium
It was built in 1965 and has a ground-floor area of 1,083 m2.
Tennis court
Repair work to its artificial grass was done in 2009 by Kofu-field Company.
Alumni House
It was constructed in 1967 as a part of the 50th-anniversary celebrations of Kyushu University. A small lecture hall was added in 1980.

Dwelling facilities and nursery
Foreign Visitors' Quarters
It was constructed in 1967
Nurses Dormitory
Provides facilities for nurses, rent-free apartments are one-room style stateroom with bathroom and kitchen.

Day care center for children of faculty members of Kyushu University in the Maidashi campus. Opened on 24 November 2008.

Facilities for the bodies of anatomical donors
There are several facilities for the bodies of anatomical donors. The Charnel House is a Japanese-style house built in 1939, but nowadays there is a funeral chapel in the new Hospital Building. Donor bodies are cremated in a crematorium. There is also a monument demonstrating the gratitude and respect for those who donated their body for medical research and education.

Memorial Streets
Generally, all former Imperial Universities have statues commemorating famous alumni and professors. On the Maidashi campus of Kyushu University, streets are named after them. 
Ōmori Street 
This street runs east and west from the main gate. Ōmori Street honors professor Ōmori Harutoyo, the first president of Fukuoka Medical School, the forerunner of Kyushu Imperial University Medical School.
Miyairi Street
This street runs from north to south from the intersection with Ōmori Street.  Miyairi Street honors Keinosuke MIYAIRI, a professor of Kyushu Imperial University Medical school and a well-known researcher of parasites and sanitarian.
Kubo Street
Inokichi Kubo was a professor of Kyushu University Medical School and pioneer of otorhinolaryngology in Japan.
Inada Street
The bacteriologist Ryukichi Inada was a professor of Kyushu Imperial University Medical School's first department of internal medicine.
Tawara Street
The pathologist Sunao Tawara was a professor of Fukuoka Medical School and is internationally known for his pioneering research on the conduction system of the mammalian heart.
Hashimoto Street
Hakaru Hashimoto Ph.D. was a medical scientist, discoverer of Hashimoto's thyroiditis and the first alumnus of Kyushu Imperial University Medical School.

Hakozaki Campus
The Hakozaki Campus is located about 1 km east of the Maidashi Campus. It is scheduled to be relocated to the Ito campus.

Buildings dating from the era of Imperial Kyushu University

Kyushu University Headquarters.
This two story brick building was designed by Ken Kurata and was built in 1925. The building material was reused brick taken from the admission building of the department of technology Kyushu Imperial University, which burned in 1923. After the execution it was used as tentative laboratory and office of the department of technology. In 1928 the head office of University, previously located in Law school building, moved there.
In 1922, Albert Einstein visited Japan, and on 25 December, he visited Kyushu Imperial University, when he took a ceremonial photograph with professors in front of the department of technology.
Kyushu Imperial University: School of Law and Literature main building
This building is a three-story reinforced concrete building. It was designed by Ken Kurata and constructed in April 1924. The front of this building was constructed by Iwasaki-gumi, and the back of the building by Satake Kōmu-sho. In September 1925, the head office of University removed from the area of medical school to this building, in March 1928 when it moved from the department of technology building it used.
Kyushu University School of Engineering: Department of Aeronautical Engineering.
 This building is a three-story reinforced concrete building and tower, which housed the ATCT. It was designed by Harusaburō Shimaoka and Yoshikatsu Tsuboi and was completed in March 1939.
Main gate at Hakozaki campus
It was Kyushu Imperial University School of Engineering main gate (九州帝國大學工科大學正門), and was constructed in 1911 and was made of brick.: The gate is a representative architecture of Kyushu University, it is often depicted on the cover of pamphlets from Kyushu University. It was constructed in 1922, but its designer and construction company are not known. The wall of used brick surrounds the science area of Hakozaki campus. It is used as location of the movie K-20 Kaijin nijyu-menso-den (K-20 怪人二十面相・伝) in 2008.
Admission Center
It was Kyushu Imperial University the psychology school letter of the law. This is a two story reinforced concrete building and was constructed in March 1927, it was designed by Ken Kurata.
School of Applied Chemistry in the faculty of engineering of Kyushu University.
It was the School of Applied Chemistry in the department of engineering of Kyushu Imperial University. It is a four-story reinforced concrete building, and was completed in October 1927. It was designed by Ken Kurata and Setsuzō Ibara.
Main building of engineering of Kyushu University.
 The main building of the engineering department of Kyushu Imperial University is a three-story reinforced concrete building and tower. It was designed by Ken Kurata (倉田謙); construction began in November 1928 and was completed in November 1930 by Shimizu gumi (清水組).
Faculty of Agriculture 6th Building
 It is a three-story reinforced concrete building. This building was the Kyushu Imperial University administration building for agricultural chemistry in the agricultural department. It was designed by Shuzo Kunitake (國武周蔵) and constructed by Shimizu gumi (清水組) in September 1938.

Research facilities

Gate, Hall, Rehab
Kyushu University 50th foundation memorial hall
 It was constructed in 1967 and designed by Kenji Kokichi (光吉健次) and the school and the general architecture design investigation.

Ito campus

It is located in 744 Motooka Nishi-ku Fukuoka 〒819-0395.

West Zone

Research facilities
Seakeeping and Maneuvering Basin, High-Speed Circulating Water Channel
It is an experimental aquarium for the study of vessel motion used by a section of Marine Engineers. Its gross floor area of it is 2126.24 m2 and area of architecture is 1816.01 m2, constructed by Namihira Sangyo, electrical construction was done by Sanko Denki Kogyo, and setting of the machine was Sanken Setsubi Kogyo Co,Ltd.
International Research Center for Hydrogen Energy
It is an integrated investigation Kyushu University, which is an education research center for hydrogen energy in Japan and National Institute of Advanced Industrial Science and Technology. This architecture is single story steel structure and gross floor area of it is 1013.71 m2 and area of architecture is 1031.36 m2 and is designed by Takumi Architects Co,Ltd. and Sogo Setsubi Consulting Co,Ltd. and constructed by Nishinakasuhiguchi Construction Co, Ltd. and Miyafusa reiki.
West Zone 3 and 4
It is SRC and iron structure and rises nine-stories above the ground and one underground story, gross floor area is 55,478 m2, and building area is 7,860 m2, designed by Mitsubishi Jisho Sekkei Inc. Cesar Pelli & Associates Japan, and Mishima Sekkei-jimusho.
West Zone 3 construction was done by Kohnoike, Aoki and Kamimura J V, electric work was done by Nishitetsu densetsu kogyo, machine work was Nishihara Engineering Co, Ltd. elevator was Schindler Elevator K.K., about West Zone 3 & 4, construction was done by Shimizu, Okumura, Matsumoto JV, electric work was done by Kyudenko, Kuriharanto and Kyushu system JV, machine work was Sanki, Fuji, Kyushu Hitashi JV, elevator was Otis Elevator Company, about West Zone 4, constructed by Toda, Kumagaya and Mizoe JV, and electric work was done by Toenec Corporation and Asahi JV, machine work was Shin bishi, Urayasu, Chiytoda JV and elevator was Toshiba-elevator.
West Zone 2
 It rises eleven stories above the ground and one underground story, gross floor area is 54,365 m2, and the building area is 6,126 m2, designed by REQ Okamoto, and constructed by Nishimatsu Construction, Shinryo Corporation, Kyudenko Corporation, Dai-Dan Co, Ltd, Hishinetsu JV.
This building is an educational Research facility located section of geoenvironmental engineering and System Information graduate school. On the lower level floors there is a special laboratory, in the first and second floor is an information room, the third-story contains a lecture room and above the fourth floor are sections for geoenvironmental engineering and System Information. From first floor to eleven floor Foucault pendulum has the longest wire in Japan is installed in it.
Research Laboratory for High Voltage Electron Microscopy
This is the most-advanced electron microscope observation facilities in the world, which aims to find out the state and architecture of atomic element and molecule.
Institute for Materials Chemistry and Engineering
IMCE aims to be a world-class center of materials chemistry research with an international group of researchers and it is divided into three parts in the districts of Chikushi, Hakozaki and Ito.
Energy Center
 It is a core facility, which supplies electrical energy to the whole campus.  On the first floor are dynamo rooms, super transformer rooms etc., on the second floor are general monitoring rooms of general monitor center.  It is a reinforced concrete structure rising two stories, with a gross floor area of 1,378 m2, and a building area of 1,016 m2, was designed by Azusa Sekkei, constructed by Iwasaki Kensetsu, electrical work was Hoshino Denko-sha, equipment was Showa Denko.
Lecture Hall West ---Faculty of Engineering
It is a lecture room for faculty of engineering. This building is three-story SRC structure, and partly is RC, and its gross floor area is 1,291.13 m2 and the building area is 662.09 m2.
Faculty of Mathematics Institute of Mathematics for Industry
It is SRC and partly is iron structure.
Low-Temperature Center
It is a facility supply cryogen such as liquid nitrogen and liquid helium, its gross floor area is 406.80 m2 and the building area is 435.75 m2, constructed by PFI, Ito community service.
Research Institute of Environmental for Sustainability
It is a facility for experimental trial and studying of ambient systems. Its gross floor area is 1343.98 m2 and the building area is 972.95 m2, construction was done by Heisei Kensetus, electrical work was done by kyushodensetsu., machine work was Kawamoto Industry Corporation.
Architecture and libration engineering experimental building
The gross floor area is 640,000 m2, building area is 696,77 m2, and constructed by Ito community service.

Library, Hall, Rehab
Ito library
It is a reinforced concrete structure and rises one story above the ground and includes one underground story which was designed by Kume. Its gross floor area is 6,976 m2, and building area is 3,535 m2, designed by Kume Sekisei Co.LTD, design of electrical and machine work was done by Setsubigiken, elevator was Kyushu University facility department, and constructed by construction work was Zenidaka and Hokuyo tokutei kensetsu joint-venture group, and electric work was Shimada denki shokai, machine work was Takasago Thermal Engineering Co, Ltd., elevator work was Toshiba-elevator.co,Ltd.
INAMORI Center
INAMORI Frontier Research Center, International Institute for Carbon-Neutral Energy Research (12CNER).
Open Learning Plaza
It is a public lecture room and facility for graduates. It is reinforced concrete structure and rise three-stories above the ground and one underground story, its gross floor area is 4,820.43 m2, and the building area is 2,144.99 m2. It was designed and constructed by Sato Kogyo, electric work and machine work was done by Sadenko.
QIAO - Rock Art
It was designed by Ritsuko TAHO (田甫律子) and is made of Itsuki stone describes dynamism of the terra of Kyushu with the power to stay alive and energy.

Center Zone
The Center Zone Master Plan was designed by Japanese architects, Kisho Kurokawa and Ryota Matsumoto based on César Pelli's Ito Campus Master Plan in 2002.
Water Supply Center
It supplies overall clean water and resurgent water for experiments and sewage. There are 30 water treatment receiving tanks, and processing units on the 1st and 2nd floor. The gross floor area is 2,043 m2, and the building area is 1822 m2, designed by Kyushu University facilities department, design for execution is Wesko'' and constructed by Tokukura Corporation, Wesco Corporation, Beppu Dengyo, and Sanwa shokai.
Faculty of Social and Culture Studies, Faculty of Languages and Cultures
Faculties of Social and Culture Studies, Faculty of Languages and Cultures. Its floor area is 8164.68 m2, and the building area is 1210.31 m2, and it was constructed by Asuka Kensetsu, its electrical work was done by Kyu-denko, and machine work was done by Kawamoto Kogyo.
Big Orange
Big Orange is a facility of transmission of information in Kyushu University Ito campus. There is a meeting reception room, restaurant, and a book store.

Chikushi campus

It is located in 6-1 Kasuga-koen, Kasuga, Fukuoka 816-8580.

Research facilities 
KASTEC 
KASTEC (Art, Science and Technology Center for Cooperative Research, Kyushu University) was established in 2003 with the amalgamation of Kyushu University and Kyushu Institute of Design.
C-CUBE (Collaboration Building)
 This building has seven stories. On the ground floor and the second floor is the library and the third floor to the seventh is research space.
Center of Advanced Instrumental Analysis
It was constructed in Apr. 1982, and is an on-campus collaborative education research facility.
The Research Institute for Applied Mechanics (RIAM) 
 the Division of Ocean-Atmosphere Dynamics, the Division of Plasma and Material Science, Dynamics Simulation Research Center (DSRC), the Advanced Fusion Research Center(AFRC). 
QUEST Experiment Building
Fusion research reactor (Q-shu Univ. Exp. with Steady-State Spherical Tokamak)
Power Supply Ridge
The generator supply electricity for QUEST.
Institute for Materials Chemistry and Engineering :
Department of Fundamental Organic Chemistry, Department of Applied Molecular Chemistry, Department of Integrated Materials, Department of Advanced Device Materials.
Faculty of Engineering Science Building A.
Faculty of Engineering Science Building C
Faculty of Engineering Building F
International Graduate School of Engineering Sciences.
Faculty of Engineering Building G
Department of Earth System Science and Technology.
Faculty of Engineering Science Building H
Department of Advanced Energy Engineering School of Engineering.
Institute for Ionized Gas and Laser Research
The Institute was established in 1989.
Itoh Research Center for Plasma Turbulence
Itoh-Inagaki Laboratory.

Other facilities 
Gates 
There are two gates in Chikushi campus, Onojo Gate faced in front of JR Onjo Sta. and it is within a one minute walk to the JR station but blocks up the passage of vehicles.
Administrative Offices
Faculty of Engineering Sciences, Research Institute for Applied Mechanics, Institute for Materials Chemistry and Engineering, Institute of Health Science, Center of Advanced Instrumental Analysis, Art, Science, and Technology Center for Cooperative Research.
Institute of Health Science
Wind lens

Ōhashi campus

It is located in 4-9-1 Shiobaru Minami-ku, Fukuoka 815-8540.

Research facilities
On the cusp of retirement the universities corporate status a year before, Kyushu Institute of Design was absorbed into Kyushu University in 2003.
Visual Communication Design Center 
Movie editing room for the Department of Visual Communication Design. Studios, darkrooms.
Bldg.2
Laboratories for The Department of Environmental Design, The Department of Visual Communication Design, Drafting Rooms, Staff Rooms.
Bldg3
Laboratories, staff rooms, and lecture hall for the Department of Industrial Design and Department of Acoustic Design.
Bldg.4
Laboratories and classrooms for the Department of Environmental Design.
Bldg.5
Staff rooms for the Department of Visual Communication Design, the Department of Art and Information Design, and the Department of Design Strategy.
Bldg.6
Staff rooms for the Department of Applied Information and Communication Sciences, and the Department of Design Strategy. 
Bldg.7
Laboratories of the Department of Art and Information Design and Department of Design Strategy. 
Bldg.8
Physics, chemistry, and biology Laboratories, along with staff and student rooms. 
Environmental Research Center
A Laboratory of the Department of Environmental Design for architectural-related experiments. 
Research Center for human environmental adaption
Highly advanced controlled environment facilities for the Department of Industrial Design. It was established in 1971 by Kyushu Institute of Design and completely reconstructed in 2001. 
Design Division of KASTEK
Facilities and staff for university-industry collaboration.
Printing Workshop				
A printmaking studio for the Department of Visual Communication Design. 
Design Workshop
Woodworking, welding, and metalworking equipment. 
Open Design Laboratory
Equipment and facilities for motion capture, and 3D visual experiments

Other facilities
Design Library 
The total open system was adapted to it. There is a video room and a stereo room.
Multi-purpose Building
Multiuse facility, central laboratory hall, basic experiment room and exhibit hall.
Admission Office
On the first floor is the Registrar and Student Affairs, and on the second floor there are General Affairs and Accounting Departments.
Institute of Health Science, Branch in the Ohashi Area; Cafeteria and Tea room
Convenience store and cafeteria on the 1st floor, and the Health Service Center on the 2nd floor.
Multipurpose Sports Field
Gymnasium
Facilities include; Basketball court, martial arts practice area, shower rooms, and weight training room
Utilities Building
Garage

Beppu
It is located in 4546 Tsurumihara Tsurumi, Beppu, Oita 874-0838.

Satellite office
Tokyo Office
The Tokyo Office relocated to the Yurakucho Building from the Marunouchi Naka-dori Building on April 19, 2008.
QBS
Ōhashi Satellite
It is located in front of Ōhashi Station on the Tenjin Ōmuta Line.

See also

Campus of the University of Tokyo
Campus of Keio University

References

External links
近代建築散歩-九州帝大 Modern Architecture in Kyushu Imperial University 

Kyushu University